Kim Ji-Ho (born July 22, 1974) is a South Korean actress.

Career
Audiences were first introduced to Kim Ji-ho in 1994 in Shin Seung-hun's music video "For a Long Time Afterwards." She made her acting debut in Salut D'Amour that year, followed by the films A Man Wagging His Tail (1995) and Destiny (1997), both with Park Joong-hoon. Her popularity rose after starring in the 1995 television drama Apartment, and in 1996 she appeared in commercials for more than 30 products, including Kia Avella, Amorepacific Laneige, LG Corp, and Lotte Department Store. Kim's career later slowed down, but she continues to play leading roles in TV dramas such as Law Firm (2001), Glass Slippers (2002), Affection (2002), Single Again (2005), Even So Love (2007), and You Don't Know Women (2010).

Kim has also acted in Korean stagings of Closer (2006) and Proof (2008), and had a supporting role in the critically acclaimed sleeper hit Unbowed (2012).

Personal life
Kim Ji-Ho married actor Kim Ho-Jin on December 11, 2001 at the Millennium Seoul Hilton Hotel. Their daughter was born on April 8, 2004. The couple met while shooting More Than Love in 2000.

Filmography

Television series

Films

Variety shows

Music video

Theater

Awards and nominations

References

External links
 Kim Ji-ho Fan Cafe at Daum 
 
 
 

1974 births
Living people
South Korean television actresses
South Korean film actresses
South Korean stage actresses